Alive in Poland is the fifth release and second live album by English heavy metal band Blaze Bayley, released in 2007. It features mostly the band's original material, though they also play some Iron Maiden and Wolfsbane covers, as lead singer Blaze Bayley used to be in both bands.

Track listing 
 "Intro"
 "Speed of Light"
 "The Brave"
 "Futureal" (Iron Maiden cover)
 "Alive"
 "Tough as Steel" (Wolfsbane cover)
 "Man on the Edge" (Iron Maiden cover)
 "Virus" (Iron Maiden cover)
 "Ten Seconds"
 "When Two Worlds Collide" (Iron Maiden cover)
 "Look for the Truth" (Iron Maiden cover)
 "Kill and Destroy"
 "Silicon Messiah"
 "Tenth Dimension"
 "Sign of the Cross" (Iron Maiden cover)
 "Born as a Stranger"

Personnel 
Blaze Bayley – vocals
Rich Newport – guitar
Nick Bermudez – guitar
David Bermudez – bass
Rico Banderra – drums

Blaze Bayley live albums
2007 live albums
2007 video albums
Live video albums
SPV/Steamhammer live albums
SPV/Steamhammer video albums